Likuruanga is a stratovolcano in easternmost West New Britain Province on the island of New Britain, Papua New Guinea. Its low, dissected edifice contains a large volcanic crater that is breached to the north. The last known eruption from Likuruanga is prehistoric in age, having taken place during the Pleistocene epoch.

A fatality occurred on Likuruanga's northern flank in September 2006 when a boy died in a hole at the village of Bakada. The cause of death was carbon dioxide asphyxiation.

See also
List of volcanoes in Papua New Guinea

References

Volcanoes of New Britain
Mountains of Papua New Guinea
Stratovolcanoes of Papua New Guinea
Pleistocene stratovolcanoes
West New Britain Province